Demetrius Grosse (born February 26, 1981) is an American actor and producer. He is best known for his role as Rock in the feature film Straight Outta Compton, Emmett Yawners in the Cinemax television series Banshee, Errol in the FX television series Justified, and Baron Samedi in NBC's Heroes.

Early life
Born and raised in Washington, D.C., Grosse began honing his performance skills at the age of ten. Spending time at the Summer Musical Theater Workshop, Grosse was able to practice singing, acting, and dance. As a theatre actor he honed his craft on the stage starring in more than five plays with SMTW. Through training and performance, acting, singing, and dance were all elements of performance that were developed early on as Grosse began to build his repertoire. Grosse was not always considering acting though. For a time he was interested in veterinary medicine, coding, and even cut hair as a barber at Legends, a well-known LA  barber shop. By 17 Grosse pursued his dreams of acting and studied at Gonzaga College High School. Grosse then went on and achieved an award for the Andrew Carnegie Undergraduate Grant for artistic merit and later graduated from Carnegie Mellon University with a degree from its School of Drama. In 2002, Grosse completed a visiting student program in which he finished two semesters of intensive study at the Howard University College of Fine Arts in his home of Washington DC. During July, Grosse took his craft to the international arena, studying and performing both classical and contemporary drama with the British American Drama Academy in Oxford, England. In the summer of 2007, Grosse joined Shakespeare Santa Monica. He had performed on the stages of Oxford, England with the BADA group, in Washington DC with The Shakespeare Theatre, and in Cape Town, South Africa with UCT.

Career
Grosse appeared in the HBO series Westworld based on the 1973 film of the same name. He also appeared in Michael Bay's feature film 13 Hours: The Secret Soldiers of Benghazi (2016). Grosse is known for taking on many characters from various background and of all different genres. He made his acting debut in Numbers (2005) and is well known for his roles in Straight Outta Compton (2015), Saving Mr. Banks (2013), This Is Martin Bonner (2013) and Banshee (2013). His other television credits include Justified, Criminal Minds, ER, NCIS, Heroes, Bones, Dexter, CSI: Miami and Frontier. Grosse also made appearances in The Inheritance (2011), and Hollywoo (2011). Grosse has credits for producing Last Cry for Katrina (2013), Moonshiners, and A Quiet Fire (2009).

Banshee
On Banshee, Grosse portrayed series regular character Deputy Emmett Yawners for the first two seasons. Grosse's character was the Deputy for the Banshee County Sheriff's Department in the town of Banshee, Pennsylvania. Known as a family man and the moral compass of the show, Deputy Yawners fought until the end protecting his pregnant wife in the season 2 finale episode "Bullets & Tears".

Justified

On Justified, Grosse portrayed recurring character Errol Butler who is Ellstin Limehouse's right-hand man in Noble's Holler. Errol's hand is also shown to be badly burned from lye, possibly by Limehouse for disobeying him at some point. In Season 3, Errol is shown to resemble Boyd's own former right-hand Johnny Crowder, as he is willing to turn on his leader any chance he gets and attempts to make several power plays to increase Limehouse's wealth and power, all without his boss's permission. These plays eventually get Errol kicked out of Noble's Holler in the finale "Slaughterhouse", but he returns to defend Limehouse when he sees Robert Quarles returning with Raylan Givens and another hostage. Errol takes a bullet for Limehouse and his fate is left ambiguous as the season ends. In the Season 6 episode "Sounding", Errol is revealed to be alive and on better terms with Limehouse and is ordered by him to accompany Ava into gathering supplies at a hardware store in order to excavate Boyd's money from a bank robbery to pay off Limehouse for a car. Bob Sweeney and Raylan approach the hardware store, Bob having tracked down Errol from Noble's. Bob and Errol have a stand-off as Bob attempts to lure Errol out of the store on a bogus charge so that Raylan can get Ava back into his custody. Bob then tases Errol when he refuses to cooperate and leaves with him out of the store.

Heroes
On Heroes, Grosse portrayed recurring character Baron Samedi. "Baron Samedi" was the alias used by a warlord in Haiti who escaped from Level 5. Baron Samedi has impenetrable skin, which grants him a greater resistance to physical injury than an average human. His skin is a virtually indestructible armor, impenetrable by bullets, blades, or any other known weapon. When flown into a car by Nathan, Samedi is able to stand up unscathed. According to his assignment tracker profile, Samedi's control index is 82%. His data analysis show his biological level at 80, cerebral at 45, elemental at 15 and temporal/spatial at 25.

Filmography

Film

Television

Video games

Awards and nominations

Producing

References

External links
 
 
 

1981 births
Living people
21st-century American male actors
African-American male actors
American male film actors
American male television actors
Carnegie Mellon University alumni
Gonzaga College High School alumni
People from Washington, D.C.